Spring Park is a small area in London, England. It is within the London Borough of Bromley and the London Borough of Croydon, straddling the traditional Kent-Surrey border along The Beck. Spring Park is located north of Addington, west of West Wickham and south of Monks Orchard and Shirley.

History
The area was historically known as Cold Harbour. Settlement began in the area in the 1830s at the instigation of the MP John Temple Leader, who employed the agricultural innovator Hewitt Davis to turn what was barren heathland into productive farmland. Large scale residential building began in the 1920s–1930s. The Shrublands council estate was constructed after the Second World War on compulsorily purchased land from the golf course.

The area contains a small row of shops at the junction of Bridle Road and Broom Road. The Goat pub, which closed in 2017 following an attack on a local asylum seeker, re-opened in 2019 as The Apple Tree.

Notable residents
 Joshua Buatsi - boxer, grew up on the Shrublands estate.

Gallery

References

Areas of London
Districts of the London Borough of Croydon